Ritacuba Blanco is the highest peak of Cordillera Oriental, in the Andes Mountains of Colombia. It's also named Ritak'uwa, an ancient name from the U'wa indigenous people that live in the lowlands of the National Park Sierra Nevada del Cocuy y Güicán, where the Ritacuba Blanco is located. 
The summit is accessible from the west via the town of El Cocuy, the village of Güicán, and the hamlet of Las Cabañas. The hike is fairly easy, but the weather is not reliable, and a glacier must be crossed.
Because of global warming, its glacier is melting at very high rates, backing down 25 linear mts per year; the same is happening at amazing speeds to all other snow-covered tropical mountains in Colombia. If this melting rate continues, the glacier is expected to disappear before 2055.

Directions to access the mountain 
You can access Ritacuba Blanco  either from the Cocuy or Guican in the Boyaca department. After departing from either town you have to travel to Kanwara to start the main hike to the base of the mountain.

Climbing Routes 
North West: It is the normal route which is easy technically. You will need basic mountaineering  knowledge to climb up the mountain.

East: This route is closed. However this route has great challenges for big wall climbers.

See also
 List of peaks by prominence
 List of Ultras of South America

Notes

References 
 John Biggar, The Andes, A Guide for Climbers, Andes, 3rd edition, 2005,

External links
 Close up of the Summit Ritacuba Blanco and places around it 
 Parque Nacional Natural El Cocuy Info in Spanish about the National Park where the Ritacuba Blanco is located.
 Ritacuba Blanco on Andes site

Ritacuba Blanco
Ritacuba Blanco
Geography of Boyacá Department